The Yuva Express series of trains were introduced by erstwhile Minister of Railways Mamata Banerjee during the 2009-10 budget together with the Duronto Express. They were intended to provide an air-conditioned low-cost travel option for the youth of the country.

During the budget, two trains between Howrah & Mumbai were chosen. It was initially intended to run as a point to point service however commercial stops were soon introduced on the service. Sixty percent seats of the train are reserved for students, low-income groups & people belonging to the age group of 18 - 45yrs. 

To avail this facility, a traveler must have an age/income proof certificate. A copy of the documents is required to be produced while making the booking while a second set must be carried during travel for verification by the ticket checking staff. Earlier there were only AC chair car coaches but later it was augmented by AC 2 Tier and AC 3 Tier coaches as well.

Active Services

Defunct Services

See also

References

External links
 http://articles.economictimes.indiatimes.com/2013-01-06/news/36173918_1_yuva-trains-tier-coaches-ac-3
 http://www.indianexpress.com/news/yuva-express-on-track-cheaper-travel-for-students-jobless-youth/566776/
 http://www.indianexpress.com/news/uncomfortable-chair-cars-keep-youth-away-from-yuva-trains/948376/
 https://web.archive.org/web/20140922092521/http://www.indianrail.gov.in:80/doc/Speech_English_2009-10.pdf

Rail transport in West Bengal
Rail transport in Maharashtra